Guyanese may refer to:
 Something of, from, or related to the country of Guyana
 A person from Guyana, or of Guyanese descent. For information about the Guyanese people, see:
 Guyanese people
 Demographics of Guyana
 Culture of Guyana
 Guyanese cuisine
 Guyanese Creole

See also
Guianese, of from, or related to the country of French Guiana

Language and nationality disambiguation pages